Escape is a 1948 British-American thriller film directed by Joseph L. Mankiewicz. It follows a Royal Air Force World War II veteran (Rex Harrison) who goes to prison and then escapes and meets a woman who persuades him to surrender. The screenplay by Philip Dunne was based on the 1926 play Escape by John Galsworthy, which had previously been filmed in 1930.

Plot
A former RAF squadron leader, Matt Denant, goes to Hendley, England to visit an airfield run by his friend Titch. Rodgers, an employee at the airfield, asks Matt to do him a favour by making a large wager on a horse. Matt does, but when the horse loses, Rodgers promises to repay him.

While strolling through Hyde Park, a woman strikes up a conversation with Matt, but Penter, a detective, charges her with unlawful soliciting. Matt intervenes on her behalf, but when the two men fight, Penter knocks his head on a park bench and is mortally wounded.

Matt is placed under arrest; he is then sentenced to three years in prison after Penter dies. Believing it an unjust punishment, Matt escapes. Inspector Harris of Scotland Yard is assigned to find him, while Matt takes refuge in the home of Sir James Winton, whose daughter Dora helps him hide.

Titch gives an aeroplane to Matt, enabling him to flee to France, but he is betrayed by Rodgers after the police offer a reward. Matt's plane is caught in a heavy fog and crashes. He survives and takes refuge in a farm. Dora finds him and professes her love, also persuading Matt that he must turn himself in to the law.

Cast
 Rex Harrison as Matt Denant
 Peggy Cummins as Dora Winton
 William Hartnell as Inspector Harris
 Peter Croft as Titch
 Stuart Lindsell as Sir James Winton
 Norman Wooland as Minister
 Jill Esmond as Grace Winton
 Frederick Piper as Brownie the convict
 Marjorie Rhodes as Mrs. Pinkem
 Betty Ann Davies as Girl in Park
 Cyril Cusack as Rodgers
 John Slater as Salesman
 Frank Pettingell as Constable Beames
 Michael Golden as Detective Penter
 Frederick Leister as Judge
 Walter Hudd as Defence Counsel
 Maurice Denham as Crown Counsel
 Patrick Troughton as Jim the shepherd
Peter Burdon as farmer whose trousers were stolen

Reception

Critical response
Film critic A.H. Weiler of the New York Times wrote a positive review of the film, "As the harried convict, Rex Harrison gives a restrained but persuasive portrait of a man beset not only by physical but moral tribulations ... The pace of Escape, as set by director Joseph L. Mankiewicz, is, on occasion, slower than might be desired, and scenarist Philip Dunne's script is sometimes given to lengthy conversation. But these are minor flaws in an adult work, which unspectacularly and effectively does justice to a serious theme.

Similarly, critic Craig Butler appreciated the film, writing, "Mankiewicz does a very good job of emphasizing the script's strong points, and he uses a number of interesting visual touches to keep things lively during discussions of morality and other weighty issues ... For his part, Harrison is in top form, finding multiple levels to play in dialogue that could easily devolve into rants and providing the kind of solid performance that is crucial to anchoring a film of this type. Neither he nor Mankiewicz can overcome the limitations of the script to make Escape a classic, but they do make it fairly engrossing."

References

External links
 
 
 
 

Films based on works by John Galsworthy
1948 films
1940s psychological thriller films
British psychological thriller films
Film noir
Films directed by Joseph L. Mankiewicz
20th Century Fox films
Films set in Devon
Films set in England
Films set in London
American films based on plays
Films with screenplays by Philip Dunne
Films scored by William Alwyn
American psychological thriller films
American black-and-white films
British black-and-white films
Films about prison escapes
Films produced by William Perlberg
1940s English-language films
1940s American films
1940s British films